John Quincy Farmer (August 5, 1823 – August 17, 1904) was a Minnesota politician, jurist, and Speaker of the Minnesota House of Representatives. He first served in the Minnesota House of Representatives in 1866, and was elected speaker one year later, serving in the position until he left the house in 1868. He later served in the Minnesota Senate from 1871 to 1872, and was a judge for Minnesota's 10th judicial district from 1880 to 1893.

Biography
John Quincy Farmer was born in Burke, Vermont on August 5, 1823. After graduating from law school in New York State, he moved to Omro Township, Minnesota and began practicing as a lawyer.

He married Maria N. Carpenter on November 17, 1852, and they had two sons. She died on March 6, 1866, and he remarried to Susan C. Sharp on January 13, 1869. They had six sons together.

He died on August 17, 1904, while traveling westward on a Northern Pacific train outside of Billings, Montana. Farmer had been en route to Yellowstone National Park with his wife. He was eighty-one years of age.

References

1823 births
1904 deaths
Republican Party members of the Minnesota House of Representatives
Minnesota state court judges
Minnesota state senators
Speakers of the Minnesota House of Representatives
Minnesota Whigs
19th-century American politicians
People from Caledonia County, Vermont
People from Spring Valley, Minnesota
19th-century American judges